The following is a list of rulers of baNgwaketse, a territory located in present-day Botswana.

Kgôsikgolo = Paramount Chief

(Dates in italics indicate de facto continuation of office)

Sources 
http://www.rulers.org/botstrad.html

See also 
Botswana
Heads of state of Botswana
Heads of government of Botswana
Colonial heads of Botswana (Bechuanaland)
Rulers of baKgatla
Rulers of baKwêna
Rulers of Balete (baMalete)
Rulers of Bangwato (bamaNgwato)
Rulers of baRôlông
Rulers of baTawana
Rulers of baTlôkwa

Ngwaketse